Gordon Rogoff (born May 17, 1931) is a theatre director, dramaturge, professor, and theatre critic.

Life and work 
Rogoff graduated with a bachelor's of arts from Yale University in 1952. He is currently Professor of Dramaturgy and Dramatic Criticism at Yale School of Drama.

During the 1970s, Rogoff was the director of the Center for Theatre Research at SUNY Buffalo. He has also worked with the Actors Studio and The Open Theater, both in Manhattan, New York.

He was a theatre critic for The Village Voice during the 1970s and 1980s.] He has also written for The Nation, The New Republic, The Virginia Quarterly Review, and The Reporter, as well as Parnassus: Poetry in Review and The Yale Review. He served on the editorial board of Theater during the 1970s alongside Michael Feingold, Ren Frutkin, and Richard Gilman.

Rogoff has published multiple books, including Theater is Not Safe and Vanishing Acts: Theater Since the Sixties (2000). Vanishing Acts was published by Yale University Press and compiles Rogoff's writing on theatre artists including Peter Brook, Robert Wilson, Ariane Mnouchkine, Samuel Beckett, Tennessee Williams, Alban Berg, Tony Kushner, Laurence Olivier, Donald Wolfit, Judi Dench, Anthony Hopkins, Dustin Hoffman, Al Pacino, Lee J. Cobb, Vanessa Redgrave, Geraldine Page, Joseph Papp, Eugene O'Neill, and Arthur Miller, among others.

His life partner is playwright and visual artist Morton Lichter.

Awards and recognition 

 1973: Guggenheim Fellowship (theatre arts)
1976: Obie Award (with Morton Lichter), Old Timers' Sexual Symphony
1985-86: George Jean Nathan Award for Dramatic Criticism
1991:  Morton Dauwen Zabel Award for Criticism, The American Academy of Arts and Letters
2009, 2011, 2013: fellowship, The Bogliasco Foundation

References

External links 

 Rogoff's page on La MaMa Archives Digital Collections
 Rogoff's faculty page on Yale School of Drama
Rogoff's page on the New York Institute for the Humanities
Vanishing Acts on The New York Times web archive
"A Night of Theatre with Gordon Rogoff [March 30, 2006]" (Howard Gotlieb Archival Research Center, Boston University)

Living people
1931 births
American theater critics
20th-century American non-fiction writers
Yale School of Drama faculty
University at Buffalo faculty